The National Republican Greek League (Ethnikós Dimokratikós Ellinikós Sýndesmos (EDES)) was one of the major resistance groups formed during the Axis occupation of Greece during World War II.

The largest of the non-communist resistance groups, its military wing, the National Groups of Greek Guerrillas (Εθνικές Ομάδες Ελλήνων Ανταρτών, Ethnikés Omádes Ellínon Antartón (ΕΟΕΑ)) concentrated its military activities in Epirus. From 1943 onwards, EDES came into confrontation with the communist-led National Liberation Front, beginning a series of civil conflicts that would lead to the Greek Civil War.

Foundation and ideology 
The National Republican Greek League was founded on 9 September 1941 by a former army officer, Colonel Napoleon Zervas, a centrist who had been expelled from the army after the failed pro-Venizelist coup d'état of 1935, and two of his friends, Leonidas Spais and Ilias Stamatopoulos.

Like many other resistance movements founded during that time, the political orientation of the National Republican Greek League was Republican, with a strong dislike towards the exiled king, George II, and featured some vague leftist-socialist tendencies. In the aftermath of the four-year right-wing Metaxas dictatorship, which was strongly supported by the king, the monarchy was almost universally rejected, while social ideals for "social fairness" became the vogue among the various resistance groups.

The founding charter of EDES explicitly demanded the "establishment in Greece of a Republican regime, of Socialist form", the "revelation [...] of the treason of former King George II and the gang of the so-called 4th of August Dictatorship", calling for a thorough cleansing of the state and Greek social and public life from anyone "who has not proven a National Republican [and] socialist conscience through actions". The charter acknowledged the prominent exiled Venizelist general Nikolaos Plastiras as its nominal political head, but due to his exile in France they failed to take his consent beforehand. For the time being, no reference to armed opposition against the occupying forces was made in the text.

On the same day, Komninos Pyromaglou, a friend and assistant of Plastiras, left Nice, where Plastiras resided, for Greece. He was authorize by the general to form, on his behalf, a republican organization with socialist content", and prepare to turn both "against the Occupier" and against a return of the monarchy. After his arrival in Athens on 23 September, Pyromaglou came into contact with Republican circles, and after contacting Zervas took EDES' command. In October, a five-member Executive Committee was founded, with Pyromaglou as Plastiras' representative as General Secretary and Zervas as a simple member.

As the organization grew, it succeeded in establishing links with the British Headquarters in Cairo, with a view to receiving funds, weapons and guidance. Under British pressure which at the time strongly supported the Greek monarchy, Zervas was forced to send a statement of loyalty to King George II in March 1942. This marked a silent breach with the vitriolic anti-monarchist attacks of the past months, and marked EDES's slow slide towards a more pro-monarchist stance.

The organization supported irredentism, arguing that Greece should be allowed to annex parts of Albania and Bulgaria after the war. In 1944 and 1945 it organized the expulsion of Cham Albanians, attacking many Cham villages and murdering civilians, including women and children.

Beginnings of armed resistance – The Gorgopotamos operation 
Like most similar groups, EDES was initially limited to Athens. Having the support of many prominent Venizelist and Republican military figures, EDES came into contact with EAM and tried to establish some form of cooperation. The negotiations failed over the demands of the Communists for a merger of EDES with EAM and their distrust of Zervas' pro-British attitudes.

On 23 July 1942, after intense British pressure and more than a month after the official appearance of the military wing of EAM, the Greek People's Liberation Army (ELAS), Zervas, accompanied by Pyromaglou and a handful of companions, set out for the Valtos Mountains in Aetolia-Acarnania, an area with long traditions of guerrilla warfare stretching back to the Ottoman period. From then and until the end of the Occupation, Epirus would be the primary area of operations of the EDES andartes.

Supported by British parachute drops, EDES quickly gathered some 100 fighters. The first major operation of EDES was "Operation Harling", the destruction of the Gorgopotamos viaduct by a joint force of British SOE commandos, and EDES and ELAS forces. While the successful operation, one of the greatest sabotage acts in occupied Europe, greatly boosted the prestige of the nascent Resistance, it also caused a significant rift between EDES and ELAS: the British loudly proclaimed and lauded Zervas' role in the operation, while ignoring the contribution – numerically far greater – of the leftist ELAS forces. While the rift was healed by British mediation, it presaged the problems that would appear in the future.

On 24 February 1943, Zervas addressed his friend Antonis Petsakis in a letter, urging him to create a branch of EDES in Peloponnese, before ELAS establishes full control of the region. A branch of the National Groups of Greek Guerrillas (ΕΟΕΑ) was then founded in Patras and by the summer of 1943 a small armed guerilla group was formed by E. Sevastakis. The Peloponnesean branch of EDES struggled with finding weapons and ammunition, prompting Zervas to request for a British airdrop of supplies in Achaea. The airdrop did not materialize and Sevastakis' group disbanded in late July, numbering some 70 men at the time.

List of battles
1942
 23 October - 24 November: Battle against Italian forces at Skoulikaria and at wider mountainous area of Arta, during 22 days.
 25 November: Operation Harling (Gorgopotamos).
 20–22 December: Battle against Italian forces at Ano Kalentini - Xirokampos - Velentziko - Koufalo of Arta  
1943
 20 May: Victorious battle against Italians and Cham Albanians at Agia Kyriaki village.
 22 June : Destruction of Spiliopotamos bridge.
 6 July: Victorious battle against Italian alpinists at Milia, Epirus.
 8–20 September: Battles against German forces at Metsovo, Pramada, Kalarites.
 16,19 September: Battles against Germans and Cham Albanians at Skala Paramythias.
 30 September: Attack against German forces at Xirovouni.
 30–31 October: Battle against Edelweiss Division (with the eventual participation of ELAS, mainly against the EDES forces) at Tzoumerka.
 November–December: Battles against Germans and Cham Albanians at Thesprotia.
1944
 30 March Battle in Thesprotiko against Germans and Cham Albanians.
 29 Juny: Liberation of Paramythia and Parga.
 30 Juny: Victorious battle against Germans and Cham Albanians at Menina.
 11 August: Liberation of Margariti.
 17–18 August: Conquest of Fort Menina.
 14 September: Battle of Dodona-Liberation of Lefkada.
 22 September: Liberation of Igoumenitsa and Filiates.
 7–15 October: Battles against German forces.

Accusations of Collaborationism
Following large scale clashes between ELAS and EDES in October 1943, Zervas entered into contact with the Germans and began discussing the possibility of collaboration against ELAS. In February 1944, Zervas and XXII Mountain Corps commander Hubert Lanz reached a "gentlemen's agreement". Under its terms the two sides were to enter a truce, exchange limited information on ELAS prior to each side's military operations against the communists and enter full on collaboration in case EDES found itself on the brink of collapse. According to 1st Mountain Division officer Karl Heinz Rotfuchs, the agreement remained a secret from the absolute majority of EDES members. It was also kept secret from the British, so that EDES would continue to receive material support from the former. Upon their departure from Epirus, the Germans ensured that leftover materiel would reach the hands of EDES rather than ELAS.

The left wing Greek People's Liberation Army on various occasions accused its rival organizations, and particularly EDES, of collaboration with the occupying Nazi forces. During the armed conflicts between ELAS and EDES in Athens, a propaganda war was launched with ELAS accusing EDES of collaboration, mainly due to gaining plausibility from the explicit exemption of EDES from German propaganda attacks.

On the other hand, Stylianos Gonatas, initially a political leader of EDES in Athens, won the peculiar enmity of the organization because he supported the collaborationist Security Battalions and encouraged young officers to join their ranks, which led to hostility of the EAM groups towards him. The 12th Army of Nazi Germany attempted for a short time to coopt the EDES forces, and to use them against the ELAS, but this attempt failed and in July 1944 the EDES launched new attacks.

The civil war within the Resistance 
These internal conflicts caused rivalry between resistance groups and eventually escalated into civil war. In October 1943, ELAS launched an attack on EDES. These attacks triggered a civil war that would last until February 1944.  After that, a fragile truce was established, which lasted until December, two months after the Liberation.  Then, while the ELAS of Athens attempted to overthrow the government, other units stormed the EDES positions in Epirus.  The latter was defeated and the remaining forces were evacuated to Corfu.  After the defeat of the ELAS in Athens (January 1945), EDES forces returned to Epirus, where part of them got involved to the expulsion of the Cham Albanians.

References

Sources 
 
 
 
 
 
 
 
 Center of Military History, German Antiguerrilla Operations in The Balkans (1941–1944) Washington DC: United States Army.
 The Statutes of EDES

 
Anti-communist organizations
Republicanism in Greece
Epirus in World War II
1941 establishments in Greece
1944 disestablishments in Greece
Anti-communism in Greece
1940s in Greek politics